Starlight is the second EP by Japanese band Wagakki Band, released on June 9, 2021 by Universal Music Japan in three editions: CD only, Mars Red First Edition with DVD, and Tokyo Singing First Edition with Blu-ray. In addition, a Official Fan Club exclusive box set with all versions will be released. The Tokyo Singing First Edition concert Blu-ray features the band's concert from the 2020 tour show at Tokyo Garden Theater. The track "Seimei no Aria" was used as the opening theme of the anime TV series Mars Red, while the title track was the ending theme of the Fuji TV drama series Ichikei no Karasu.

The EP peaked at No. 5 on Oricon's albums chart.

Track listing
All tracks are written by Machiya, except where indicated; all tracks are arranged by Wagakki Band.

Personnel 
 Yuko Suzuhana – vocals
 Machiya – guitar
 Beni Ninagawa – tsugaru shamisen
 Kiyoshi Ibukuro – koto
 Asa – bass
 Daisuke Kaminaga – shakuhachi
 Wasabi – drums
 Kurona – wadaiko

Charts

References

External links 
 
  (Universal Music Japan)
 

Wagakki Band albums
2021 EPs
Japanese-language albums
Universal Sigma EPs